Hamza Khafif, also known by the pseudonym TaSh36, is a Moroccan actor, poet, musician, and graphic artist from Casablanca, Morocco.

Name 
TaSh36 is the pseudonym Khafif uses for his work as a graphic artist. "TaSh" refers to Tashelhit, the language of the Shilha Amazigh people.

Career

Music 
In the past, he performed as a percussionist with Kabareh Cheikhats, a musical troop that performs traditional Moroccan and Arabic folk songs in drag.

Film 
He performed the role of Omar, one of the main characters, in Meryem Benm'Barek-Aloïsi's 2018 film Sofia, an award winning film at the Cannes Film Festival.

Graphic art 
On October 26, 2019, Khafif's work was exhibited alongside a screening of Manel Mahdouani's work on Amazigh tattooing in an exhibition called Imazighan at Bachibouzouk. TaSh36's work explored motifs from Amazigh art and culture and their relationship with Moroccan history, in an attempt to renew them.

References 

21st-century Moroccan actors
People from Casablanca
21st-century Moroccan artists
21st-century Moroccan musicians
1992 births
Living people